The Lost Throne is the fourth novel by New York Times bestselling author Chris Kuzneski. Published in November 2008 by Penguin UK, the action thriller peaked at #5 on the British fiction chart and stayed in the Top 10 for four weeks. Putnam released the American hardcover in July 2009. It won the Bronze Medal for Popular Fiction at the Florida Book Awards, which is America’s most comprehensive state book awards program. The American paperback reached the New York Times mass-market bestseller list in July 2010.

References

External links
Chris Kuzneski's Official Site

2008 novels
American thriller novels
Penguin Books books
G. P. Putnam's Sons books